The Canadian Vickers Vancouver was a Canadian transport/patrol flying boat of the 1930s built by Canadian Vickers.

It was a twin-engine, equal-span biplane.  The hull was of metal and the rest of the structure of fabric-covered wood.

Development
The Vancouver was developed as a replacement for the Varuna in response to a Royal Canadian Air Force requirement for a flying boat to transport men and equipment to forest fires. The main difference from the Varuna was a duralumin hull and more powerful engines. The two flight crew were located in two tandem open cockpits, forward of the wing. The main cabin could accommodate a firefighting team of six men and all the required equipment. Five aircraft were delivered to the Royal Canadian Air Force, one was later converted into a coastal patrol aircraft.

Operational history
In the mid-1930s, the Vancouvers were modified as coastal patrol aircraft by the installation of machine guns and bombs.

After the outbreak of the Second World War, Vancouvers served with 4 Squadron, RCAF at Jericho Beach Air Station until withdrawn from service in 1940.  After a brief period of service in training duties, they were finally withdrawn and struck off in 1940.

None of the aircraft saw service after 1940, one private offer to acquire was denied.

Variants
Data from:Canadian Aircraft since 1909
 Vancouver I – prototype with Armstrong Siddeley Lynx IV engines, one built.
 Vancouver IA – designation of prototype after installation of Armstrong Siddeley Lynx IVC engines.
 Vancouver II – production transport version with Armstrong Siddeley Lynx IVC (three aircraft) or Wright J-6 Whirlwind (two aircraft) engines, five built.
 Vancouver IIS/S – conversion of three Lynx-powered Vancouver IIs to "service standard" with three Lewis gun cockpits for coastal patrol, powered by Armstrong Siddeley Serval IV engines.
 Vancouver IIS/W – "service standard" conversion of two Wright J-6 Whirlwind powered Vancouver IIs.

Operator
 Royal Canadian Air Force
No. 4 Squadron RCAF 1939-1940

Specifications (Vancouver IIS/W)

See also

References

1920s Canadian patrol aircraft
Vancouver
Biplanes
Aircraft first flown in 1929
Twin piston-engined tractor aircraft